The Mahmud Çelebi Mosque or Boyali Mosque (Μπογιαλί Τζαμί) is an Ottoman mosque in the northern Greek city of Veria, Greece.

History 
The mosque was built on the southern city wall of old Veria, and lies next to the city's Byzantine Museum. One of the city's five dervish lodges was situated to its south in Ottoman times, probably the one known as Baba Tekke.

Its second name, "Boyali Mosque", means "Painted Mosque" and refers to the bright colours with which its exterior was originally decorated. Only traces of them survive today, and the building looks externally indistinguishable from a private residence with its tiled roof, a role which it played for a while in the 20th century. Its most striking feature was its minaret, which resembled a Doric order column in its fluted shape. The minaret collapsed in 1940, and only the base survives today.

References

Sources 
 

Ottoman mosques in Greece
Buildings and structures in Veria
Former mosques in Greece